The  New Orleans VooDoo season was the sixth season for the franchise in the Arena Football League. The team was coached by Pat O'Hara and played their home games at New Orleans Arena. The VooDoo however, were defeated in the conference semifinals by the Philadelphia Soul, 53–66.

Standings

Schedule

Regular season
The VooDoo had a bye in week 1 and began the season in week 2 at home against the Philadelphia Soul on March 18. They hosted the Georgia Force on July 21 in their final regular season game.

Playoffs

Roster

References

New Orleans VooDoo
New Orleans VooDoo seasons
New Orleans VooDoo